Trusted Reviews is a web publication focused on technology, published in London, UK by Incisive Media.

History 
Trusted Reviews was founded in 2003 by Hugh Chappell and Riyad Emeran as a response to the decline in sales of computer reviews magazines. Launched to provide a web only product for increasingly internet-literate users, access was deliberately made free to compete with paid-for magazine subscriptions. The website covers the consumer technology market, focusing on mobile phones, TV and audio visual equipment and computing.

In 2007, the-then IPC Media bought Trusted Reviews in order to expand its digital operations.

In 2010, Cliff Jones was appointed editor of Trusted Reviews.

In 2012, Evan Kypreos was appointed editor.

In 2018, Nick Merritt was appointed Editor-in-Chief.

Prior to Meredith purchasing Time Inc., Trusted Reviews was regularly featured as a contributor to Time Magazine.

In 2020, Future plc acquired TI Media, the then-parent company of Trusted Reviews and then sold Trusted Reviews to Incisive Media.

References

External links 
 Official website

Internet properties established in 2003
2003 establishments in the United Kingdom
Technology websites
British technology news websites